The Bride Is Much Too Beautiful (French: La mariée est trop belle)  is a 1956 French comedy film directed by Pierre Gaspard-Huit and starring Brigitte Bardot, Micheline Presle and Louis Jourdan. It was also known by the alternative title of Her Bridal Night.

The film was based on the 1954 novel of the same title by Odette Joyeux. It was shot at the Billancourt Studios in Paris and on location in Saint-Émilion in Southern France. The film's sets were designed by the art director Jean d'Eaubonne.

Cast
 Brigitte Bardot as Catherine Ravaud, aka Chouchou 
 Micheline Presle as Judith Aurigault 
 Louis Jourdan as Michel Bellanger 
 Marcel Amont as Toni 
 Jean-François Calvé as Patrice 
 Roger Dumas as Marc 
 Madeleine Lambert as  Agnès
 Marcelle Arnold as Mme Victoire
 Colette Régis as Yvonne
 Roger Tréville as M. Designy 
 Annie Roudier as La cuisinière
 Nicole Gueden as Juliette
 Dominique Boschero

References

Bibliography
 Phillips, Alastair & Vincendeau, Ginette. Journeys of Desire: European Actors in Hollywood. British Film Institute, 2006.

External links

1956 films
Films directed by Pierre Gaspard-Huit
French comedy films
1956 comedy films
1950s French-language films
Pathé films
Films shot at Billancourt Studios
Films scored by Norbert Glanzberg
1950s French films
French black-and-white films